Saintry-sur-Seine (literally Saintry on Seine) is a commune in the Essonne department in Île-de-France in northern France.

Population
Inhabitants of Saintry-sur-Seine are known as Saintryens in French.

See also
Communes of the Essonne department

References

External links

Mayors of Essonne Association 

Communes of Essonne
Sénart